Pelham Crescent may refer to:

 Pelham Crescent, London
 Pelham Crescent, Hastings, home to the Grade II* listed Pelham Arcade